Ghada Jamal (born 1955) is an abstract artist born in Beirut, Lebanon. Jamal studied Fine Arts at Lebanese American University (LAU) before relocating to California to pursue a Master's degree from California State University in Long Beach.

Jamal's artwork, though abstract, depicts Middle Eastern landscapes, especially those of Lebanon, through various political and economic eras. With the use of oil, acrylic, and chalk on canvas and paper, her work varies in tone from peaceful and serene images to violent and brutal expressions, often emphasizing images and experiences of war.

Throughout her artistic career, Jamal has explored the boundaries of abstract art by tackling diverse topics such as the physical, emotional and spiritual devastation caused by the Lebanese civil war, Iraqi war, and Palestinian massacres; delved into the reinterpretation of Arabic music and poetry; and revisited the idea of identity and identification, the transformation and devastation of contemporary life, the majesty of landscape and the architectural grandeur of city space.

Ghada Jamal currently lives, paints, and teaches at the Notre Dame University and the American University of Beirut in Lebanon. Jamal's artwork has been exhibited, as part of both Solo and Group exhibitions, around the world. Her artwork is currently displayed in the United States, England, France, Jordan, and Lebanon.

References

External links
 Monthlyherald.com
 Nationalgallery.org

Living people
1955 births
American abstract artists
Lebanese American University alumni
California State University, Long Beach alumni
University of Notre Dame faculty
Lebanese expatriates in the United States
Lebanese people of American descent
Lebanese contemporary artists
American women artists
Lebanese women artists
American women academics